Hanne Claes (born 4 August 1991 in Hasselt) is a Belgian athlete specialising first in the 200 metres and later 400 metres hurdles. 

She competed at the 2020 Summer Olympics.

Career 
She finished fourth at the 2018 European Championships in the 400 metres hurdles and 4 × 400 metres relay.

International competitions

1Did not finish in the final

Personal bests
Outdoor
100 metres – 11.49 (+0.9 m/s, Heusden-Zolder 2012)
200 metres – 23.26 (+0.7 m/s, Helsinki 2012)
400 metres – 54.36 (Oordegem 2012)
400 metres hurdles – 55.20 (Brussels 2018)
Indoor
200 metres – 23.94 (Ghent 2011)
400 metres – 54.34 (Ghent 2018)

References

External links
 
 
 
 

1991 births
Living people
Belgian female sprinters
Belgian female hurdlers
Sportspeople from Leuven
Belgian Athletics Championships winners
Competitors at the 2015 Summer Universiade
Athletes (track and field) at the 2020 Summer Olympics
Olympic athletes of Belgium